Andrei Ovidiu Marc (born 29 April 1993) is a Romanian professional footballer who plays as a centre back for FC Brașov.

International career
From 2010 to 2011, Marc was a member of the Romania national under-17 football team.

Personal life
His father, Ovidiu was also a footballer and spent most of his career at Ceahlăul Piatra Neamț scoring 48 goals in 186 Liga I matches.

Honours

Ceahlăul Piatra Neamț
Liga II: 2010–11

References

External links
 
 

1993 births
Living people
Sportspeople from Piatra Neamț
Romanian footballers
Romania youth international footballers
Romania under-21 international footballers
Association football defenders
CSM Ceahlăul Piatra Neamț players
FC Dinamo București players
Şanlıurfaspor footballers
CS Concordia Chiajna players
FC Steaua București players
FC Brașov (2021) players
Liga I players
Liga II players
TFF First League players
Romanian expatriate footballers
Romanian expatriate sportspeople in Turkey
Expatriate footballers in Turkey